Une liaison pornographique (US title: An Affair of Love) is a 1999 romantic drama film by Frédéric Fonteyne, and written by Philippe Blasband.

Plot
A man and a woman meet to fulfill a sexual fantasy. But slowly feelings emerge and create a relationship. Sex, it seems, is not the only thing that unites them.

Cast
 Nathalie Baye –  Her 
 Sergi López – Him 
 Jacques Viala –  Interviewer (voice) 
 Paul Pavel – Joseph Lignaux 
 Sylvie Van den Elsen –  Madame Lignaux 
 Pierre Gerranio –  Hotel receptionist 
 Hervé Sogne –  Ambulance driver 
 Christophe Sermet –  Hospital employee

Awards  
It won the audience award at the Tromsø International Film Festival in 2000.

References

External links
 
 

1999 films
Erotic fantasy films
Erotic drama films
Belgian drama films
Swiss drama films
French drama films
Luxembourgian drama films
1999 romantic drama films
Films shot in Brussels
Films set in Paris
Films shot in Paris
1990s French-language films
French-language Swiss films
French-language Belgian films
Films directed by Frédéric Fonteyne
1990s French films